Yu Zhen (born 5 June 1997) is a Chinese footballer.

Club career
Yu Zhen received a ban of five months by Chinese Football Association for age falsification on 10 January 2017. He was promoted to Dalian Yifang's first team squad who newly promoted to the Chinese Super League in 2018. On 2 May 2018, he made his senior debut in a 1–0 away win over Chongqing Dangdai Lifan in the fifth round of 2018 Chinese FA Cup, coming on as a substitute for Zhang Hui in the 62nd minute. He made his league debut three days later on 5 May 2018, in a 3–0 home win over Guangzhou Evergrande Taobao, coming on for Nicolás Gaitán in the 79th minute.

Career statistics
.

References

External links
 

1997 births
Living people
Chinese footballers
Footballers from Dalian
Dalian Professional F.C. players
Chinese Super League players
Association football defenders